Mill Creek is a  long 3rd order tributary to the Little River in Moore County, North Carolina.

Course
Mill Creek rises on the Aberdeen Creek divide about 1.5 miles east of Pinehurst in Moore County, North Carolina.  Mill Creek then flows northeasterly to meet the Little River about 0.25 miles east of Lakeview.

Watershed
Mill Creek drains  of area, receives about 49.2 in/year of precipitation, has a topographic wetness index of 448.46 and is about 34% forested.

External links
Mill Creek Trail

References

Rivers of North Carolina
Rivers of Moore County, North Carolina